Rapture is a 1965 drama film directed by John Guillermin, and starring Melvyn Douglas, Patricia Gozzi, and Dean Stockwell. It is reportedly Guillermin's own favorite among his films. His widow Mary said it "was the only film he directed that wholly satisfied his vision as an artist."

Plot 
Young teenager Agnes, her retired widower father, and their caretaker Karen, live in an old house on the Brittany coast in France. Agnes, who is immature and perhaps backward, has been removed from school and lives an isolated and childlike life.

While walking home from church, they witness a prison bus crash. The convicts attempt to flee and are shot at by the guards. One knocks down a guard and injures him before escaping.

Agnes finds the convict in their shed: in her imagination, she thinks that she has created him from a scarecrow, and her creation belongs to her. She does not tell the police about him. The family hide him and he stays for a while. The gendarme dies and the police believe the family know something about the fugitive. He and Karen become close but Agnes catches them kissing and attacks Karen, who leaves.

The fugitive leaves separately, refusing to go with Karen, but Agnes follows him and he brings her home. A relationship develops and, after, her father objects, they leave together for a town. However, she struggles to manage a household and returns home. The police question her about her absence. She says nothing but the fugitive, following her home, is seen, chased and killed.

Cast 
 Melvyn Douglas as Frederick Larbaud 
 Patricia Gozzi as Agnes Larbaud 
 Dean Stockwell as Joseph 
 Gunnel Lindblom as Karen

Production

Development
The film was based on the novel Rapture in My Rags published in 1954. The New York Times called it "a touching story". The Los Angeles Times called it "a tremendously worthwhile experience."

The book became a best seller in England. In 1957 film rights were bought by Andre Hakim the son in law of Daryl F. Zanuck of 20th Century Fox, where Hakim had a production deal. Hakim beat out Carol Reed and Hecht Hill Lancaster who both wanted the novel. She said he wanted Audrey Hepburn and Yul Brynner to play the lead.

In March 1963 Daryl F. Zanuck listed the film on the slate of 20th Century Fox projects for that year, with a tentative start date of 10 September.

Shooting
Filming eventually began September 1964 in France. It was directed by John Guillermin who signed a four picture deal with Fox. Gozzi had been in Sundays and Cybele.

Serge Bourguignon, who had directed Gozzi in Sundays and Cybele later said Zanuck wanted him to direct the film "but I didn't want to do it. He said, "Well, you can do it with the same style," but I refused. So they hired Guillermin, who is a very good director, but Patricia didn't get along with him at all.

Dean Stockwell later recalled:
Rapture could have been  interesting but didn’t turn out to be that interesting. It was a little film with a girl named Patricia Gozzi who had a great deal of success in a film prior to this one. I don’t think she went on to a career after that. But I had a hell of a time working in France, I loved it! The director, John Guillermin, was kind of a maniac. He’s known to be a maniac, and he is! I got along with him pretty well, though. But, I don’t think it was a good film.

Reception

Critical
Time magazine called the film a "penumbral play of love against loneliness"
that "boost[s] the artistic stock of English director John Guillermin" and "clinch[es] the reputation of France's 15-year-old Patricia Gozzi."

The Los Angeles Times called it "a beautifully made movie of nuances".

Box Office
According to Fox records, the film needed to earn $2,500,000 in rentals to break even and made $1,310,000, meaning it made a loss.

See also
List of American films of 1965

References

External links

Rapture at Letterbox DVD
Rapture at BFI
Rapture at TCMDB
Review at Cinema Retro

1965 drama films
American black-and-white films
Films directed by John Guillermin
1965 films
20th Century Fox films
CinemaScope films
1960s English-language films
English-language French films
French drama films
1960s French-language films
American drama films
Films scored by Georges Delerue
Films with screenplays by Stanley Mann
Films set in Brittany
Films shot in France
Films about prison escapes
1960s American films
1960s French films